Ornithuroscincus sabini is a species of skink. It is endemic to Milne Bay Province, eastern Papua New Guinea.

Ornithuroscincus sabini measure  in snout–vent length. The limbs are short.

References

Ornithuroscincus
Skinks of New Guinea
Reptiles of Papua New Guinea
Endemic fauna of New Guinea
Endemic fauna of Papua New Guinea
Reptiles described in 2020
Taxa named by Edward Frederick Kraus